The Focke-Wulf A 17 Möwe (German: "Gull") was an airliner built in Germany in the late 1920s. It was a conventional high-wing cantilever monoplane with fixed tailwheel undercarriage. The aircraft provided fully enclosed seating for up to eight passengers and had a separate, fully enclosed flight deck for the two pilots. Most examples flew with Deutsche Luft Hansa, serving until around 1936. In the early 1930s, two A 17s were used for testing the Junkers Jumo 5 diesel engine.

In 1929, an example was built with a BMW VI engine and fitted out for aerial photography and survey work and designated A 21. The cabin was equipped with a darkroom. Later the same year, the BMW engine was used on a further five airliners for Luft Hansa, these being designated A 29.

Variants
 A 17 - Eight-passenger airliner powered by  Gnome et Rhône 9Aa Jupiter. One prototype and 11 production aircraft.
 A 17a - Conversion of A 17 with  geared Siemens Jupiter VI engine.
 A 17b - Conversion with Siemens Sh 20u engine. One converted.
 A 17c - Conversion with  Junkers Jumo 5C diesel engine. One converted.
 A 21 Photomöwe - Photographic fitted with BMW VI engine (two built)
 A 26 - Converted A 17 used as an experimental aircraft by Deutsche Versuchsanstalt für Luftfahrt (DVL).
 A 29 - production version of A 17 with BMW VI engine. Five built.

Specifications (A 17a)

See also

References

 
 
 
 
 
 German aircraft between 1919 and 1945

1920s German airliners
A 17
Single-engined tractor aircraft
High-wing aircraft
Aircraft first flown in 1927